Harald Otto Walther Wolff (11 January 1909  June 1977) was a German stage, film and television actor.

Life
Harald Wolff was born in Barmen (now Wuppertal) in 1909. After finishing high school and a commercial apprenticeship, he became an actor, giving his debut in Helmut Käutner's 1939 comedy Kitty and the World Conference.

After World War II, in addition to appearances in German films, he also acted in various international productions, including the 1951 American war drama Decision Before Dawn by Anatole Litvak, the 1956 French comedy film La Traversée de Paris by Claude Autant-Lara, Maurice Labro's 1957 Action immédiate, and Jacques Demy's 1964 musical The Umbrellas of Cherbourg. In 1972, he made his final appearance in Costa-Gavras' political thriller State of Siege.

Wolff was also a voice actor who dubbed many internationally known actors over the decades. These include Desmond Llewelyn as Q in the James Bond films Goldfinger and Thunderball, Charles Boyer in Casino Royale, Vincent Price in Cry of the Banshee and Claude Rains in The Adventures of Robin Hood.

Filmography

References

External links
 

1909 births
1977 deaths
German male film actors
German male stage actors
German male television actors
21st-century German politicians